Khelocala Dam is an earthfill dam on Khelocala river near Sillod in State of Maharashtra in India.

Specifications

Purpose
 Irrigation

See also
 Dams in Maharashtra
 List of reservoirs and dams in India

References

Dams in Maharashtra
Dams completed in 1964
1964 establishments in Maharashtra
Earth-filled dams
20th-century architecture in India